Mitchell River is a river in the Kimberley region of Western Australia.

The river rises north east of Sharp Hill and flows in a north-westerly direction until discharging into the Indian Ocean via Walmsley Bay near Port Warrender.

In 1921 the river was named after Sir James Mitchell the Premier of Western Australia by surveyor William Eastman.

Nine species of freshwater fish are known to inhabit the waters of the Mitchell River.

There is another Mitchell River located in Western Australia that is a tributary of the Hay River in the south of the state.

References 

Rivers of the Kimberley region of Western Australia